The 2010 Tennislife Cup was a professional tennis tournament played on outdoor red clay courts. It was the fourth edition of the tournament which was part of the 2010 ATP Challenger Tour. It took place in Naples, Italy between 27 September and 3 October 2010.

ATP entrants

Seeds

 Rankings are as of September 20, 2010.

Other entrants
The following players received wildcards into the singles main draw:
  Alberto Brizzi
  Enrico Fioravante
  Fabio Fognini
  Potito Starace

The following players received entry from the qualifying draw:
  Andrea Arnaboldi (as a Lucky Loser)
  Farrukh Dustov
  Boris Pašanski
  Aldin Šetkić
  Luca Vanni

Champions

Singles

 Fabio Fognini def.  Boris Pašanski, 6–4, 4–2, RET.

Doubles

 Daniel Muñoz-de la Nava /  Simone Vagnozzi def.  Andreas Haider-Maurer /  Bastian Knittel, 1–6, 7–6(5), [10–6]

External links
Official site
ITF Search 

Tennislife Cup
Tennislife Cup
Clay court tennis tournaments